Michael John McCarthy (born November 10, 1963) is an American football coach who is the head coach of the Dallas Cowboys of the National Football League (NFL). From 2006 to 2018, he was the head coach of the Green Bay Packers. In 2011, he led the team to a win in Super Bowl XLV over his hometown Pittsburgh Steelers. He was previously the offensive coordinator for the San Francisco 49ers and New Orleans Saints.

During his 16 seasons as a head coach in the NFL, McCarthy has an overall regular season record of 155–97–2. He is among the only five head coaches (Tom Landry, Chuck Noll, Andy Reid and Bill Belichick) to lead one franchise to eight straight playoff appearances. McCarthy is second to Curly Lambeau in all-time wins leading the Packers.

Early life 
McCarthy was born and raised in Pittsburgh, in the blue-collar neighborhood of Greenfield. His mother, Ellen McCarthy, was a secretary who also worked in restaurants and for the Peace & Justice Center. His father, Joe McCarthy, was a firefighter for the Pittsburgh Fire Bureau and an officer for the Pittsburgh Police. He also owned a bar called Joe McCarthy's Bar and Grill, which Mike spent his Sundays cleaning before church. McCarthy was raised as a Pittsburgh Steelers fan.

McCarthy was one of five siblings. He has three sisters, Colleen, Ellen, and Kellie, and a younger brother Joseph McCarthy III (d. 2015). Mike attended St. Rosalia primary school, where he played basketball. He later made annual donations to the school.  McCarthy attended Bishop Boyle High School.

Playing career 
In 1984, McCarthy attended Scottsdale Community College in Arizona, playing one season for the Fighting Artichokes football team. McCarthy transferred to Baker University, an NAIA school located in Baldwin City, Kansas. He was a two-time all-conference tight end. In 1986 McCarthy was captain of the team, which finished the season as the national runner-up in NAIA Division II. 

In 1987, McCarthy earned a B.S. in business administration.

Coaching career

College
In 1987, Duane Dirk, the defensive coordinator at Fort Hays State University in Kansas, hired McCarthy as a defensive graduate assistant (GA). Over the next two years, McCarthy focused on linebackers and defensive ends. During his time as the defensive graduate assistant, McCarthy pursued a master of science degree; he graduated with a M.S. in Sports Administration in 1989.

After serving as a graduate assistant at Fort Hays State from 1987 to 1988, McCarthy returned home to Pittsburgh. On July 30, 1989, McCarthy contacted Mike Gottfried, the head coach at the University of Pittsburgh, looking for a coaching job, but no positions were available. McCarthy was told to mail his resume. He later showed up at Gottfried's office without an appointment to introduce himself. A couple of days later, one of Gottfried's assistants resigned, and McCarthy was offered a volunteer coach position without pay. McCarthy later worked under coach Paul Hackett.

He served as a graduate assistant for three seasons before coaching wide receivers during the 1992 season. Initially, he also worked the night shift on the Pennsylvania Turnpike as a toll collector during the off-season to supplement his income. McCarthy stated he spent his time in the tollbooth reviewing the University of Pittsburgh playbook.

Kansas City Chiefs 
In 1993, McCarthy and Paul Hackett left Pittsburgh and were hired by the NFL's Kansas City Chiefs under head coach Marty Schottenheimer. McCarthy worked two years as an offensive quality control assistant. As Head Coach of the Green Bay Packers, McCarthy hired six former quality control coaches to serve as his position coaches. In 1993 and 1994, McCarthy worked with Hall of Fame quarterback Joe Montana.

In 1995, McCarthy became quarterbacks coach for the Chiefs, overseeing Rich Gannon, Elvis Grbac, and Steve Bono. McCarthy's signal callers threw 52 interceptions — the lowest in the American Football Conference (AFC) during the years from 1995 through 1998.

Green Bay Packers 
When Schottenheimer resigned from the Chiefs after the 1998 season McCarthy left Kansas City and became the Packers' quarterbacks coach. There he worked with Hall of Famer Brett Favre. In the 1999 season, while working with McCarthy, Packers quarterback Brett Favre threw for 4,091 yards, the fourth-best total of his career. While McCarthy was quarterbacks coach, the 1999 Packers team was ranked seventh in passing and ninth in overall offense in the league.

New Orleans Saints 
In 2000, McCarthy was hired as the offensive coordinator for the New Orleans Saints. That year, the Saints achieved a 10–6 regular season record, then
won their first playoff game in the franchise's history and finished 10th overall in offense. McCarthy was selected as National Football Conference (NFC) Assistant Coach of the Year by USA Today in 2000. 

The Saints failed to make the playoffs over the next three years. In 2002 the Saints led the NFC in scoring, with 49 touchdowns and 432 points, but slowed down at the end of the season. In 2003, the Saints scored 340 points—their eighth highest-scoring season ever. All of McCarthy's four years with the Saints rank in the team's top 10 years for offense. 

While McCarthy was with the team, the Saints’ offense set 25 individual and 10 team records. Joe Horn caught 45 touchdowns and 437 passes for 6,289 yards. During McCarthy's time with the team, running backs Ricky Williams and Deuce McCallister both had a 1,000-yard season. In his first two years, running back Ricky Williams would run for 2,245 yards with 14 touchdowns. McCarthy stayed with the team for five seasons through 2004.

San Francisco 49ers 
In 2005, McCarthy served as offensive coordinator for the San Francisco 49ers by coach Mike Nolan. His unit had setbacks, including the trade of their most experienced quarterback, Tim Rattay. Rattay was replaced by a rookie quarterback, top draft pick Alex Smith, who was injured in week 7 of the season. 

The team finished the season ranked 30th in the NFL in points scored and dead last in yards gained. Despite this, rookie running back Frank Gore would emerge to run for 608 rushing yards on 127 carries with a 4.8 Yards Per Carry (YPC). Wide receiver Brandon Lloyd had 733 yards receiving and five touchdowns.

Green Bay Packers

2006–2009 
After Mike Sherman took the Packers to a 4-12 record in 2005, the team released him on January 2, 2006 and immediately started interviewing for a replacement. McCarthy was interviewed by Packers general manager Ted Thompson on January 8, 2006, and was offered the head coaching position three days later.

In 2006, the Packers started with a 4–8 record, but the team still managed to win their last four games after both quarterback Brett Favre and backup quarterback Aaron Rodgers sustained injuries, finishing the season 8–8, and ending with a win against their archrival, the Chicago Bears.

McCarthy guided the Packers to an 8–1 record in the first 9 games of the 2007 season, tying Washington's Joe Gibbs for the best win–loss ratio to start the first 25 games of a career at 16–9 and passing Vince Lombardi, who went 15–10, for the best coaching start in Packers' history. The team finished the regular season with a 13–3 record and obtained the number two seed in the NFC playoffs.  McCarthy led the Packers to the NFC Championship game, where they lost to the eventual Super Bowl-winning New York Giants in overtime.

After the 2007 season, he finished second in voting for The Associated Press Coach of the Year award, garnering 15 votes to Bill Belichick's 29 votes. He signed a five-year contract extension with the team on January 19, 2008, which raised his salary to $3.4 million a year.

The 2008 season was a tumultuous one. Aaron Rodgers, previously the backup, became the starting quarterback when Brett Favre announced his retirement in March. Favre then changed his mind and sought his previous position as the Green Bay quarterback. The organization reiterated its intent to move forward with Rodgers as the new face of the Packers, although Favre was offered the backup position behind Rodgers. Favre refused the offer, and the organization traded him to the New York Jets in exchange for a conditional fourth-round draft pick.

The 2008 season started with a 5–5 record, followed by five consecutive losses. The season ended with a 31–21 victory over the Detroit Lions, bringing the Packers' regular season record to 6–10. The Packers finished third in the NFC North, ahead of only the Lions, and did not make the playoffs. Under McCarthy, quarterback Aaron Rodgers threw for over 4,000 yards and posted a 93.8 passer rating.

Rodgers improved on his 2008 statistics in 2009, but was sacked 50 times, more than any other quarterback in the NFL. The Packers dominated teams with losing records but were swept by their rival Minnesota Vikings, led by former Packers franchise quarterback Brett Favre. The Packers lost to the previously winless Tampa Bay Buccaneers, but then came back to beat the NFC East-leading Dallas Cowboys. Under McCarthy's leadership, they then began a five-game winning streak and qualified for the playoffs with a Week 17 win over the Cardinals, finishing with an 11–5 record. 

This was the second playoff berth in McCarthy's tenure.  The Packers lost the Wild Card round to the Arizona Cardinals in overtime, 51–45.

2010 

In 2010, the Packers had 25 players on the injured reserve list throughout the season. Running back Ryan Grant sustained an injury in week one that sidelined him for the rest of the season. McCarthy nonetheless led the Packers to a 10–6 regular season finish, never losing by more than four points and never trailing by more than 7 throughout the entire season. This record earned them second place in the NFC North, behind the Chicago Bears, with whom they split victories in the regular season. 

They went into the NFC playoffs as the sixth seed. The Packers defeated the number three-seeded Philadelphia Eagles by a 21–16 score in the Wild Card round. They then played the number one-seeded Atlanta Falcons, beating them by a convincing margin of 48–21.

The Packers then played the second-seeded Chicago Bears for the third time that season in the NFC Championship game. They won 21–14 and advanced to Super Bowl XLV. After this game, McCarthy's team had a 3–0 postseason record on the road.

Super Bowl XLV 
Super Bowl XLV pitted the Packers against the Pittsburgh Steelers. This was the first time these two storied franchises had played each other in the postseason. Ahead of the game, confident in his team's performance, McCarthy had the team fitted for Super Bowl championship rings. 

The Packers defeated the Steelers 31–25 to win their fourth Super Bowl and 13th NFL title overall. The win returned the Lombardi Trophy to Green Bay for the first time since the team's 1996 season.

2011–2017 
The 2011 Packers team was a record-setting one, leading the NFL in points scored and setting a franchise record for wins at 15-1 and consecutive wins. McCarthy's offensive strategies facilitated quarterback Aaron Rodgers' NFL MVP season, as he threw for 4,643 yards and 45 touchdowns, throwing most often to receiver Jordy Nelson.

The Packers' season ended, however, in the NFC Divisional Round, where they played the New York Giants. The team had suffered a number of setbacks, including the season-ending neck injury of defensive back Nick Collins, and appeared to have suffered, rather than benefited, from the time off, dropping 9 passes in this game. Eli Manning of the Giants attacked the Packers’ weaker defense (ranked 19th in scoring defense) and the Packers lost 37–20. 

2012 saw the Packers attain an 11–5 record that ranked them first in the NFC North Division, the first time the Packers had won two consecutive NFC titles since the three they won during the 2002–2004 seasons. McCarthy's offensive strategies led to the Packers scoring 433 points, with Aaron Rodgers passing for 4,295 yards. The 2012 postseason was the 28th time the franchise had secured a playoff berth. After beating the Vikings in the first round they lost to the 49ers in the Divisional round by a score of 45-31.

In 2013 McCarthy led the 2013 Packers to a regular season record of 8–7–1 and the NFC North title, the third consecutive division win. That year, McCarthy took his team to their fifth straight playoff appearance. During the summer of 2014, the village board of Ashwaubenon, Wisconsin voted to rename Potts Avenue “Mike McCarthy Way.” 

In 2014 McCarthy guided the Packers to their fourth consecutive NFC North title with a 12–4 record during the regular season. The team ranked sixth in the NFL in total offense, with an average of 386 yards per game, and first in points scored, with an average of 30.4 points per game. In receiving yards, Jordy Nelson led the team with 1,519 yards. Aaron Rodgers threw for 4,381 yards and Eddie Lacy recorded 1,139 rushing yards.

In November 2014, McCarthy signed a contract extension through 2018. With a victory over the Tampa Bay Buccaneers in week 16 of the 2014 season, McCarthy notched his 99th win, passing Hall of Famer Vince Lombardi (98) for second on the Packers' all-time wins list, behind only Hall of Famer Curly Lambeau (212). 

The Packers defeated the Dallas Cowboys in the divisional round of the playoffs, but then, in the NFC Championship game against the Seattle Seahawks, the Packers collapsed, despite holding a 16–0 lead at halftime and a 19–7 lead in the final minutes of the fourth quarter, going on to lose the game 22–28 in overtime. McCarthy was criticized after making several questionable play calls during this loss. At the start of the game, he went for two field goals at the 1 yard line, and was criticized for "not going for it". During the last five minutes of the game, McCarthy called three run plays to Eddie Lacy with 3:52 minutes left, and the Packers punted on fourth down; critics slammed McCarthy for "not giving Aaron Rodgers a chance" to win the game. A day after the loss, McCarthy stated that he is "not questioning his play-calling", as well as stating that he "came to run the ball".

Others defended him; in March 2015, at the annual owners' meetings, Bill Belichick stated that McCarthy is "one of the best coaches I've ever gone up against."

Notwithstanding his rejection of the criticism of his heavily run-dependent strategy McCarthy relinquished play calling duties to long-time assistant Tom Clements in February 2015. 

While the Packers made the playoffs for the seventh consecutive time after the 2015 season, the team struggled with a languishing running game. In December, McCarthy once again took over play calling responsibilities. After he did so, the Packers recorded a 28–7 victory over the Cowboys, running the ball for 230 yards.

The 2016 season made Mike McCarthy the fourth head coach in the history of the NFL to take his team to eight-plus consecutive playoff appearances. In the postseason, McCarthy's Packers won the wild card game against the Giants (38–13) and then the NFC Divisional Playoff against the Cowboys (34–31). The team lost to the Atlanta Falcons at the NFC Championship (44–21).

McCarthy's 2017 team started the season with a 4–1 record, but was later hamstrung by an injury to Rodgers, who sustained a collarbone injury in week 6 versus Minnesota. Afterwards, backup quarterback Brett Hundley made his first career start. With only a backup quarterback to work with, McCarthy failed to clinch a postseason appearance in 2017.

2018 
On January 2, 2018, it was announced that McCarthy had signed a one-year contract extension with the Green Bay Packers.

On December 2, 2018, after a 20–17 loss to the Arizona Cardinals, McCarthy was released by the Packers after 13 seasons as the head coach. McCarthy led the team to nine playoff appearances and a Super Bowl win.

The timing of the personnel decision caught McCarthy by surprise, as he noted in an interview with ESPN.com. McCarthy said: “Time provides the opportunity for reflection and clarity and that's where I'm at now. And it's clear to me now that both sides needed a change.”

2019 Hiatus 
After McCarthy was released as Packers head coach, he expressed plans to interview with the New York Jets and the Cleveland Browns. The Arizona Cardinals expressed interest, but he declined to proceed with an interview. 

McCarthy's interview with the Browns was initially scheduled for Thursday, January 3, before being moved to a week later. The Browns offered McCarthy the head coach position, but he declined it, because it would have required him to retain Freddie Kitchens as offensive coordinator. The Browns hired Kitchens instead. 

McCarthy interviewed with the Jets on January 5, 2019. The Jets also interviewed Kansas City Chiefs offensive coordinator Eric Bieniemy and former Miami Dolphins coach Adam Gase. The Jets proceeded to hire Adam Gase. 

On January 9, 2019, McCarthy announced that he intended to sit out the 2019 season and return for 2020. McCarthy spent time improving his football knowledge and strategies. In collaboration with fellow coaches such as Jim Haslett, Frank Cignetti Jr. and Scott McCurley, McCarthy studied league playbooks, league trends, and analytics, with the intention of returning to the NFL. He said that his “McCarthy Project” made him “definitely a better coach.”

Dallas Cowboys
After Head Coach Jason Garrett parted ways with the Dallas Cowboys, McCarthy interviewed for the job. The interview for the vacant head coach position took place over 12 hours. McCarthy interviewed with Dallas Cowboys owner Jerry Jones, executive vice president Stephen Jones, and chief sales and marketing officer Jerry Jones Jr. 

On January 7, 2020, McCarthy was announced as the Cowboys' new head coach. McCarthy, who spent his season off watching game film and learning about analytics with fellow coaches, told Jones during the interview that he watched every play of the 2019 season. During his introductory press conference to announce his hiring, McCarthy said: “I need to confess: I told Jerry I watched every play of the 2019 season. I wanted the job. You do what you gotta do right?”

McCarthy is the Cowboys' ninth head coach since the organization was founded in 1960. On September 13, 2020, McCarthy lost his debut as the head coach of the Cowboys against the Los Angeles Rams by a score of 20–17. On September 20, 2020, McCarthy received his first win as the Cowboys' head coach in a 40–39 comeback win against the Atlanta Falcons.

The Cowboys finished the 2020 season with a 6–10 record, placing third in the NFC East. After losing starting quarterback Dak Prescott to a broken ankle early in the season (October 11), the Cowboys still remained in playoff contention in a weak conference for most of the season. The team struggled defensively, allowing 473 points, which was the Cowboys' worst-ever defensive showing. After the season, the Cowboys released defensive coordinator Mike Nolan, along with defensive line coach Jim Tomsula.

McCarthy was fined $50,000 by the NFL on July 1, 2021, for violating practice rules during organized team activities. As a result of the fine, McCarthy said in a statement the majority of the 7 to 9 plays the NFL discussed with him involved younger players.

In July through September 2021, McCarthy and the Cowboys were featured on the HBO sports documentary Hard Knocks. The experience, which McCarthy called “a good one,” involved a large camera crew filming the entirety of Cowboys training camp.

For the 2021 season, McCarthy guided the team to a 12-5 record and division title, including sweeping the entire NFC East for the first time since 1998. McCarthy missed the December 2nd game against the New Orleans Saints after testing positive for COVID 19 and being placed in COVID protocols for 10 days. The Cowboys were upset at home by the San Francisco 49ers in the playoffs in the Wild Card round. The game ended with the clock running out on the Cowboys following a quarterback draw as they attempted to spike the ball to stop the clock to permit a final pass play.

McCarthy was particularly criticized for his decision to use a quarterback draw with 14 seconds left in the fourth quarter, instead of going for two or more passes from further out. McCarthy defended his decision, explaining that he was hoping to get another, easier play in after coming closer to the end zone and that he thought that 14 seconds was sufficient to allow his team to do this.

For the 2022 season, McCarthy led the Cowboys to a 12-5 record, tying the 2021 season record and placing second in the NFC East. In game 1 versus the Tampa Bay Buccaneers, quarterback Dak Prescott suffered a thumb fracture that required surgery and absence from the team until Week 7. McCarthy replaced him with backup quarterback Cooper Rush who went 4-1 over the next five games. McCarthy led the Cowboys to a 31-14 victory in the Wild Card game versus the Buccaneers, which according to Tom Brady would be the last game of his career. McCarthy's season ended following the Cowboys’ loss to the 49ers in the Divisional round.

In January 2023, McCarthy announced that the Cowboys would be parting ways with offensive coordinator Kellen Moore. He also parted ways with six other coaches. In February 2023, team owner Jerry Jones stated that McCarthy would call plays during the following season. McCarthy hired new coaching staff, including assistant offensive line coach Ramon Chinyoung and offensive coordinator Brian Schottenheimer.

Awards
In 2007, McCarthy was voted the Motorola NFL Coach of the Year after twice receiving Coach of the Week awards. He was also named the NFL Alumni's Coach of the Year by a group of former players.

In 2008, McCarthy received the distinguished service award at the Lee Remmel sports awards banquet in Green Bay. McCarthy was selected as National Football Conference (NFC) Assistant Coach of the Year by USA Today in 2000.

Personal life
In 1995, McCarthy and his high school sweetheart, Christine, amicably divorced. On March 15, 2008, Mike and Jessica McCarthy were married. The couple has five children between them; two sons from Jessica's previous marriage, a daughter from McCarthy's previous marriage and two daughters together.

McCarthy and his wife Jessica have a history of giving back to communities and people in need. The couple were involved with the Seven Loaves Project in Rwanda. They founded the McCarthy Family Foundation, a charitable nonprofit. The McCarthy Family Foundation has donated frequently to the American Family Children's Hospital in Madison, Wisconsin. McCarthy hosts an annual golf tournament to benefit the hospital, and his foundation's fundraising was integral for the building of the hospital's Surgical Neonatal Intensive Care Unit. The Foundation has donated to the MVP Foundation which brings together combat veterans and former professional athletes as they transition to a new life off the field.

The foundation has also donated $100,000 (which the Green Bay Packers matched) to the Green Bay Police Foundation. The funds were used to purchase protective equipment for police officers in the area. The money was also spent on outreach programs intended to build community relations, and on bias prevention training for the officers.

On February 26, 2019, McCarthy was accused of berating three high school basketball referees after his stepsons playoff game. McCarthy went on a "verbal tirade" while following the officials to their locker room. McCarthy apologized to the school's athletic department the next day.

Head coaching record

References

External links

Dallas Cowboys bio

1963 births
Living people
American football tight ends
Baker Wildcats football players
Dallas Cowboys head coaches
Fort Hays State Tigers football coaches
Green Bay Packers coaches
Green Bay Packers head coaches
Kansas City Chiefs coaches
New Orleans Saints coaches
Pittsburgh Panthers football coaches
San Francisco 49ers coaches
Super Bowl-winning head coaches
Sportspeople from Pittsburgh
Coaches of American football from Pennsylvania
Players of American football from Pittsburgh